Longlands is an area of South East London within the London Boroughs of Bexley, Bromley and Greenwich.

Longlands or Longland may also refer to:

Places 

Longlands, Bradford, a district in the city centre of Bradford, West Yorkshire
Longlands Fell, a small fell in the northern part of the English Lake District
Longland (Holicong, Pennsylvania), a historic home located near Holicong, in Buckingham Township, Bucks County, Pennsylvania
Longlands School, former secondary school in Stourbridge, West Midlands, England
Sir David Longland Correctional Centre, former name of Brisbane Correctional Centre, a prison facility in Wacol (near Brisbane), Queensland, Australia
Longlands, County Down, a townland in the parish of Comber. County Down, Northern Ireland
Longlands, County Antrim, a small area near Whitewell Road
Longlands, Cumbria, is a place in Cumbria, England
Longland River, a tributary of Hudson Bay, in Nunavik, Nord-du-Québec, Québec, Canada
Longlands, New Zealand, a rural community near Hastings, New Zealand

People 
Frank Longland (1870–1934), architect in Brisbane, Queensland
Harry Longland (1881–1911), English cricketer
Jack Longland (1905–1993), English educator, mountain climber, and broadcaster
John Longland (died 1547), English bishop of Lincoln from 1521 to 1547
Bob Longland, former Queensland Electoral Commissioner, sent as part of delegation to monitor the Solomon Islands general election, 2006

Other uses 
Long Land Pattern, a version of the Brown Bess, a British Army's Land Pattern Musket in service 1722–1838